The Prospect Hill Monument, also occasionally called the Prospect Hill Tower is a stone structure in Somerville, Massachusetts. It is a block away from the heart of Union Square (Somerville), a neighborhood in Somerville.  Its name is formally the Prospect Hill Memorial Flag Tower and Observatory.  

The tower is four stories tall and built out of iron and stone.  The lower deck, outside of the first floor is open to the public and offers a panoramic view of Boston, Somerville, and Cambridge.   At various points the city of Somerville has offered tours of the tower, though these are currently closed due to upcoming construction.

History 

The tower is located at the top of Prospect Hill, which was the site of American fortifications during the Revolutionary war and also served as a training facility during the Civil War.  The monument itself was designed by Ernest W. Bailey and built in 1904.  It has been refurbished several times since in order to preserve its structural soundness.  As of August 28, 2020, it reopened after renovation. It is closed now due to COVID-19.

Flag 
The monument flies the Grand Union Flag, a precursor to the American flag.  During the Revolutionary War, George Washington reportedly hoisted the Grand Union Flag himself over the very land the tower now sits atop.  Some sources  cite this as the first time that any American flag was raised.  Historical research has corroborated this story.

References

External links
 Prospect Hill Tower
 Rehabilitation

Buildings and structures in Somerville, Massachusetts